The 71st Jaeger Brigade or 71 OYeBr is a  Jaeger infantry brigade of the Ukrainian Air Assault Forces, formed in 2022 in response to the Russian invasion of the Ukraine.

The inscription "IMMITIS" on the badge of the brigade means "merciless".

History
The 71st Jaeger Brigade was created soon after the launch of the 2022 Russian invasion of Ukraine, which escalated the Russo-Ukrainian War on 24 February 2022.

Raised as a unit of the Reserve Corps, in April 2022 units of the new brigade left the Reserve and took part in hostilities in the Kharkiv Oblast. From June 2022, they also appeared in the Donbas.

Units of the 71st Brigade were seen in the initial stages of the Ukrainian offensive in the Kharkiv region in September 2022. Between 5 and 8 September, its fighters crossed the Donets River and led an offensive on Balakliia, coming from the direction of Husarivka. In October 2022, soldiers of the brigade were honoured by the commanding officer of the Ukrainian Air Assault Forces, Major-General Maksym Myrhorodsky, his message stating that at that time they were performing combat missions in the Donetsk region. In the same month, the Brigade was reported as taking part in defensive battles near Bakhmut, and according to the Austrian analyst Tom Cooper in a successful counterattack on the outskirts of that city in December.

As of December 2022, the Ukrainian armed forces had three such Jaeger brigades, each with around 2,000 fighters, the 61st, 68th, and 71st Jaeger Brigades. The word Jaeger is German for "hunters", implying forest troops, and the units are neither light nor heavy.

Structure
 Brigade Headquarters and HQ Company
Special forces company of the OUN — Immitis
Reconnaissance company
1st Special forces unit
2nd Special forces unit
3rd Special forces unit
4th Special forces unit
Field Artillery Battalion
1st field gun artillery battery
2nd field gun artillery battery
3rd field gun artillery battery
Anti-tank artillery battalion (Towed)
Mortar battery
Anti-tank guided missile battery
Engineer and sapper company
Automotive company
CBRN protection company
Field communication unit
Medical company

Honours
On 6 December 2022, by a decree of the President of Ukraine, Volodymyr Zelenskyi, the 71st Jaeger Brigade was awarded the "For Bravery and Courage" award.

Notes

External links

Brigades of the Ukrainian Air Assault Forces
Airmobile brigades
Military units and formations established in 2022